This is a list of baronetcies in the Baronetage of Ireland. There were first created in 1619, and was replaced by the Baronetage of the United Kingdom in 1800. The list is in alphabetical order.

This list is not currently complete.

A

B

C

D

E

F

G

H

I

J

K

L

M

N

O

P

R

S

T

V

W

Y

See also
List of extant Baronetcies
List of baronetcies in the Baronetage of England
List of baronetcies in the Baronetage of Nova Scotia
List of baronetcies in the Baronetage of the United Kingdom
List of baronetcies in the Baronetage of Great Britain

References

External links
Baronetcies to which no Succession has been proved

Ireland

Ireland-related lists